Martin Reynolds may refer to:

Martin Reynolds (athlete) (born 1949), British track and field athlete
Martin Reynolds (civil servant), British civil servant
Martin Reynolds (politician) (born 1950), Wisconsin politician and legislator